The 1941 Class ET 125, later adjusted series 276.0 (DR) or 477 (DBAG), was an electric railcar which traversed the DC-powered S-Bahn in Berlin during 1934/35. It was built in 1936 and 1938. The cars, which were popularly known as banker trains, were rebuilt after World War II and the series ET / EB 166 adapted. Among other things, they lost the more powerful 1949/50 traction motors. From the 1970s, they were included in the modernization program and in series 277 rebuilt (after 1991 477/877), they were used on Berlin's S-Bahn network until 2003.

These trains were deployed when the section between Potsdamer Ringbahnhof and Wannsee were electrified including the part of Zehlendorf stretch.

Berlin S-Bahn
Train-related introductions in 1934